The Berlin Wall Speech was delivered by United States President Ronald Reagan in West Berlin on June 12, 1987. The speech is commonly known by a key line from the middle part: "Mr. Gorbachev, tear down this wall!". Reagan called for the General Secretary of the Communist Party of the Soviet Union, Mikhail Gorbachev, to open the Berlin Wall, which had encircled West Berlin since 1961.

Though Reagan's speech received relatively little media coverage at the time, it became widely known after the fall of the Berlin Wall in 1989. In the post-Cold War era, it was often seen as one of the most memorable performances of an American president in Berlin after John F. Kennedy's "Ich bin ein Berliner" speech of 1963. It was written by Peter Robinson—then a speechwriter for the President—who currently hosts the Uncommon Knowledge program of the Hoover Institution.

Background
The "tear down this wall" speech was not the first time Reagan had addressed the issue of the Berlin Wall. In a visit to West Berlin in June 1982, he stated, "I'd like to ask the Soviet leaders one question [...] Why is the wall there?". In 1986, 25 years after the construction of the wall, in response to West German newspaper Bild-Zeitung asking when he thought the wall could be removed, Reagan said, "I call upon those responsible to dismantle it [today]".

On the day before Reagan's 1987 visit, 50,000 people had demonstrated against the presence of the American president in West Berlin. The city saw the largest police deployment in its history after World War II.  During the visit itself, wide swaths of Berlin were closed off to prevent further anti-Reagan protests. The district of Kreuzberg, in particular, was targeted in this respect, with movement throughout this portion of the city in effect restrained completely (for instance the U1 U-Bahn line was shut down). About those demonstrators, Reagan said at the end of his speech: "I wonder if they ever asked themselves that if they should have the kind of government they apparently seek, no one would ever be able to do what they are doing again".

The speech drew controversy within the Reagan administration, with several senior staffers and aides advising against the phrase, saying anything that might cause further East-West tensions or potential embarrassment to Gorbachev, with whom President Reagan had built a good relationship, should be omitted. American officials in West Germany and presidential speechwriters, including Peter Robinson, thought otherwise. According to an account by Robinson, he traveled to West Germany to inspect potential speech venues, and gained an overall sense that the majority of West Berliners opposed the wall. Despite getting little support for suggesting Reagan demand the wall's removal, Robinson kept the phrase in the speech text. On Monday, May 18, 1987, President Reagan met with his speechwriters and responded to the speech by saying, "I thought it was a good, solid draft." White House Chief of Staff Howard Baker objected, saying it sounded "extreme" and "unpresidential", and Deputy U.S. National Security Advisor Colin Powell agreed. Nevertheless, Reagan liked the passage, saying, "I think we'll leave it in."

Chief speechwriter Anthony Dolan gives another account of the line's origins, however, attributing it directly to Reagan. In an article published in The Wall Street Journal in November 2009, Dolan gives a detailed account of how in an Oval Office meeting that was prior to Robinson's draft Reagan came up with the line on his own.  He records impressions of his own reaction and Robinson's at the time. This led to a friendly exchange of letters between Robinson and Dolan over their differing accounts, which The Wall Street Journal published.

Speech 
Arriving in Berlin on Friday, June 12, 1987, Reagan and his wife were taken to the Reichstag where they viewed the wall from a balcony. Reagan then gave his speech at the Brandenburg Gate at 2:00 p.m., in front of two panes of bulletproof glass shielding him from East Berlin. Among the spectators were West German president Richard von Weizsäcker, chancellor Helmut Kohl, and West Berlin mayor Eberhard Diepgen. In the speech, he said:

Response and legacy

The speech received "relatively little coverage from the media", Time magazine wrote 20 years later. John Kornblum, senior US diplomat in Berlin at the time of Reagan's speech, and US Ambassador to Germany from 1997 to 2001, said "[The speech] wasn't really elevated to its current status until 1989, after the wall came down." East Germany's communist rulers were not impressed, dismissing the speech as "an absurd demonstration by a cold warrior", as later recalled by Politburo member Günter Schabowski. The Soviet press agency TASS accused Reagan of giving an "openly provocative, war-mongering speech."

Former West German Chancellor Helmut Kohl said he would never forget standing near Reagan when he challenged Gorbachev to tear down the Berlin Wall. "He was a stroke of luck for the world, especially for Europe."

In an interview, Reagan claimed that the East German police did not allow people to come close to the wall, which prevented the citizens from experiencing the speech at all.

Peter Robinson, the White House speech writer who drafted the address, said that the phrase "tear down this wall" was inspired by a conversation with Ingeborg Elz of West Berlin; in a conversation with Robinson, Elz remarked, "If this man Gorbachev is serious with his talk of Glasnost and perestroika he can prove it by getting rid of this wall."

In a September 2012 article in The Atlantic, Liam Hoare pointed to the many reasons for the tendency for American media to focus on the significance of this particular speech, without weighing the complexity of the events as they unfolded in both East and West Germany and the Soviet Union.

Author James Mann disagreed with both critics like Hoare, who saw Reagan's speech as having no real effect, and those who praised the speech as key to shaking Soviet confidence. In a 2007 opinion article in The New York Times, he put the speech in the context of previous Reagan overtures to the Soviet Union, such as the Reykjavik summit of the previous year, which had very nearly resulted in an agreement to eliminate American and Soviet nuclear weapons entirely. He characterized the speech as a way for Reagan to assuage his right-wing critics that he was still tough on communism, while also extending a renewed invitation to Gorbachev to work together to create "the vastly more relaxed climate in which the Soviets sat on their hands when the wall came down." Mann claimed that Reagan "wasn't trying to land a knockout blow on the Soviet regime, nor was he engaging in mere political theater. He was instead doing something else on that damp day in Berlin 20 years [before Mann's article] – he was helping to set the terms for the end of the cold war."

In November 2019, a bronze statue of Reagan was unveiled near the site of the speech.

Gallery

See also

 Evil Empire speech
 Ich bin ein Berliner
 Speeches and debates of Ronald Reagan

References

Further reading
 Robinson, Peter. It's My Party: A Republican's Messy Love Affair with the GOP. (2000), hardcover, Warner Books, 
 Ambassador John C. Kornblum: "Reagan's Brandenburg Concerto", The American Interest, May–June 2007
 Ratnesar, Romesh. "Tear Down This Wall: A City, a President, and the Speech that Ended the Cold War" (2009)
 Daum, Andreas W. "America's Berlin, 1945‒2000: Between Myths and Visions". In Frank Trommler (ed.), Berlin: The New Capital in the East. Washington, DC: Johns Hopkins University, 2000, pp. 49–73, online.
 Daum, Andreas W. Kennedy in Berlin. New York: Cambridge University Press, 2008.

External links

 Full text and audio MP3 of the speech at AmericanRhetoric.com
 Full video of President Reagan delivering the speech at the Brandenburg Gate, courtesy of the Reagan Foundation.
 Ronald Reagan Signed and Inscribed Photograph at the Berlin Wall Shapell Manuscript Foundation
 Reagan speechwriter Peter Robinson reflecting on the speech before the Commonwealth Club of California in 2004.
 Image of text at National Archives site
 "Tear Down This Wall" How Top Advisers Opposed Reagan's Challenge to Gorbachev—But Lost by Peter Robinson
 
Discussion of "Tear Down This Wall" speech featuring Peter Robinson, June 11, 2021, C-SPAN

1987 in West Germany
1987 in international relations
1987 in politics
1987 speeches
1987 neologisms
1980s in West Berlin
June 1987 events in Europe
Allied occupation of Germany
Anti-communism in Germany
Anti-communism in the United States
Anti-communist terminology
Articles containing video clips
Berlin Wall
Cold War speeches
German reunification
Germany–Soviet Union relations
Germany–United States relations
United States–West Germany relations
Soviet Union–United States relations
History of the foreign relations of the United States
American political catchphrases
Political quotes
Presidency of Ronald Reagan
Speeches by Ronald Reagan